The 17th Miss Chinese International Pageant, Miss Chinese International Pageant 2005 was held on January 29, 2005 in Hong Kong. The pageant was organized and broadcast by TVB in Hong Kong. Miss Chinese International 2004 Linda Chung of Vancouver, British Columbia, Canada crowned Leanne Li as the new winner. Li was the fourth winner from Vancouver to win the crown and the second time a consecutive win occurred.

Pageant information
The theme to this year's pageant is "Unlimited Beauty, Five Thousand Years of Enticement" 「美麗無限 五千年的心動」. The Masters of Ceremonies include Lawrence Cheng and Stephen Au, with Joe Ngai as the guest host during the interview round. Special performing guest was cantopop singer Eason Chan.

Results

Special awards
Miss Friendship: Jolene Chin 陳影雯 (Kuala Lumpur)
Miss Gorgeous: Kate Tsui 徐子珊 (Hong Kong)

Contestant list

Crossovers
Contestants who previously competed or will be competing at other international beauty pageants:

Miss World
 2009: Toronto, : Lean Ma (Top 7)

External links
 Miss Chinese International Pageant 2005 Official Site

TVB
2005 beauty pageants
2005 in Hong Kong
Beauty pageants in Hong Kong
Miss Chinese International Pageants